
The following is a list of Playboy Playmates of 1996.  Playboy magazine names its Playmate of the Month each month throughout the year.

January

Victoria Alynette Fuller (born December 11, 1970, in Santa Barbara, California, United States) is an American glamour model, artist, actress and reality TV contestant. She is Playboy magazine's Playmate of the Month for January 1996 and has appeared in Playboy Special Editions. Fuller posed for Playboy again in the May 2005 issue.

February

Kona Carmack (born October 1, 1976, in Honolulu, Hawaii) is an American model and actress. She was born and raised in Honolulu. She is Playboy magazine's Playmate of the Month for February 1996. She is of Irish, Spanish, Filipino, Chinese, and Hawaiian descent.
Carmack was a pre-med major at the University of North Carolina Wilmington (UNCW), then graduated from the University of Southern California Film School in December 2003.  She worked in production for the TV series Deadwood and Monk. Carmack married TV personality Andrew Yani on December 27, 2003. The two divorced in 2004.

March

Priscilla Lee Inga Taylor (born August 15, 1976 in Miami) is an American model and actress. She is Playboy magazine's Playmate of the Month for March 1996.  Her centerfold was photographed by Richard Fegley.

April

Gillian Bonner (born February 3, 1966, in Athens, Georgia) is Playboy magazine's Playmate of the Month for April 1996.  Her centerfold was photographed by Richard Fegley. She later went on to produce and star in the PC game Riana Rouge.

May

June

Karin Katherine Taylor (born November 28, 1971) is a model and actress of Jamaican-Chinese and Brazilian heritage, chosen by Playboy as its Playmate of the Month for June 1996. Taylor also appeared on Malcolm and Eddie, Weird Al Show, Keenen Ivory Wayans Show, and Baywatch – in addition to guest hosting on E!.

July

 

Angel Lynn Boris (born August 2, 1974, in Fort Lauderdale, Florida) is an American model and actress sometimes credited as Angel Boris Reed. She appeared in a Playboy pictorial featuring the women of Hawaiian Tropic, and became Playboy's Playmate of the Month for July 1996.  Her centerfold was photographed by Richard Fegley. Boris has also performed in films. television shows and music videos.

August

Jessica Lee (born February 18, 1975) is a model originally from Binghamton, New York. She is Playboys Playmate of the Month for August 1996.

September

Jennifer Lynn Allan was born on May 14, 1974 in Las Vegas, Nevada, US. She is Playboys Playmate of the Month for September 1996. She has appeared in Playboy Special Editions as well as in Playboy videos.

October

Nadine Chanz (alternate spelling Nadine Tchanz, originally Nadine Tschanz) (born April 17, 1972, in Hildesheim, West Germany) is a German model and actress. She is Playboy magazine's Playmate of the Month for October 1996.

November

Ulrika Ericsson (born Anna Ulrika Eriksson on September 10, 1970, in Gävle, Gävleborg County) is a Swedish model and actress. She is Playboys Playmate of the Month for November 1996.

December

Karen Victoria Silvstedt (born 19 September 1974 in Skellefteå, Västerbotten County), best known as Victoria Silvstedt, is a Swedish model, Playboy Playmate of the Year, actress and singer. She is also a radio and TV hostess, a published singer, and a former national-level skier in Sweden.

See also
 List of people in Playboy 1990–1999

References

1996-related lists
1996
Playmates Of 1996